Lucy is Maaya Sakamoto's third studio album. In addition to writing the lyrics of seven of the songs, she added her own acoustic guitar playing to the mix of several tracks.

Track listing

Charts

References

2001 albums
Maaya Sakamoto albums
Victor Entertainment albums